Stenophalium is a genus of Brazilian plants in the tribe Gnaphalieae within the family Asteraceae.

Species 
 Species
 Stenophalium almasense D.J.N.Hind - Bahia
 Stenophalium chionaeum (DC.) Anderb. - Minas Gerais, Bahia, Rio de Janeiro
 Stenophalium eriodes (Mattf.) Anderb. - Bahia
 Stenophalium heringeri (H.Rob.) Anderb. - Minas Gerais, D.F., Goiás

Formerly included 
 Stenophalium gardneri - Achyrocline gardneri
Achyrocline

References

Gnaphalieae
Endemic flora of Brazil
Asteraceae genera